Roberta Runa Enrica Alenius (born 29 July 1978) is a Swedish politician who served as Press Secretary and as Chief Communications Officer, at the Prime Minister's Office, during the premiership of former Prime Minister Fredrik Reinfeldt from 2006 to 2014.

Alenius was born in Stockholm, Sweden. Her father is Italian. Prior to entering the Prime Minister's Office, Alenius worked as an administrator to the Moderate Party in the European Parliament and as a tax advisor at Ernst & Young.

On 23 February 2015, Alenius and Fredrik Reinfeldt confirmed they were in a relationship. On 14 January 2017, Alenius confirmed they were expecting Reinfeldt's fourth and her first child.

References 

1978 births
Living people
21st-century Swedish women politicians
Politicians from Stockholm
Swedish jurists
Tax lawyers